The Carlos Palanca Memorial Awards for Literature winners in the year 1985 (rank, title of winning entry, name of author).

English division
Short story
First prize: “A Nobel Prize for Jorge Luis Borges” by Eli Ang Barroso; and “The Hand of God” by Conrado De Quiros
Second prize: 
Third prize: “Men of the East” by Charlson Ong

Poetry
First prize: “Dream of Knives” by Alfred A. Yuson; and “Miscellanea 1984-1985” by Alfredo N. Salanga
Second prize: “Ara Vos Prec” by Eric Gamalinda; “Confabulations” by Felix Fojas; and “Finders of the Image” by Mariano Kilates
Third prize: “In the South Country” by Juaniyo Arcellana; “The Gift Supreme” by Merlie Alunan; and “Voyage in Dry Season” by Jose Victor Peñaranda

Essay
First prize: “Micro Sense, Macro Madness” by Conrado De Quiros
Second prize: “In Memory of Rizal, In Remembrance of Madrid” by Gregorio Brillantes
Third prize: “A Filipino Poet's Tokyo” by Alfred A. Yuson; and “Reportage on the State of Class War and Philippine Poetry” by Edel Garcellano

One-Act Play
First prize: “El Sentido del Indio” by Jorge Hernandez
Second prize: “First Fruits” by Elsa M. Coscolluela
Third prize: “Blessed are the Poor” by Herminia Sison

Full-length play
First prize: No winner
Second prize: No winner
Third prize: “The Maragondon Conspiracy” by Felix A. Clemente; and “Passion Play” by Florencio Quintos

Filipino division
Short story
First prize: “Unang Binyag” by Ernie Yang
Second prize: “Mga Lamat ng Moog” by Danilo Consumido
Third prize: “Alitaptap sa Gabing Maunos” by Lamberto E. Antonio

Poetry
First prize: “Puntablangko” by Mike L. Bigornia
Second prize: “Pagsalubong sa Habagat” by Lamberto E. Antonio
Third prize: “Etsetera” by Alfredo N. Salanga

Essay
Special prizes:
“Isang Munting Aklat ng mga Gunita” by Anselmo Roque
“Now for the Fun of Flowing Gutter” by Fidel Rillo, Jr.
“Pagbuo ng Sariling Pampanitikang Ideolohiya” by Pedro L. Ricarte
“Patria Concha Andal: Ina, Bilanggo, Biktima” by Sol Juvida
“Seks/Dahas: Pelikula/Lipunan” by Isagani R. Cruz

One-act play
First prize: No winner
Second prize: No winner
Third prize: No winner
Special mention “Experimento” by Vergel A. Ramos; “Pulanlupa” by Bonifacio Ilagan; and “Sa Ngalan ng Ama” by Roberto Jose De Guzman

Full-length play
First prize: “Sandatahan” by Jose C. Papa
Second prize: “Pansamantalang Dilim” by Bienvenido Noriega Jr.
Third prize: “Martir” by Roberto Jose De Guzman; and “Stateside” by Corazon Urquico

References

 

Palanca Awards
Palanca Awards, 1985